Jakub Sviták (born 10 May 1991) is a Czech handball player for Dukla Prague and the Czech national team.

He participated at the 2018 European Men's Handball Championship.

References

1991 births
Living people
Sportspeople from Prague
Czech male handball players